Bence Gyurján (born 21 February 1992) is a Hungarian football player who plays for Tiszakécske. His brother Márton is a footballer too.

Club statistics

Updated to games played as of 26 October 2014.

References 
HLSZ

1992 births
Living people
People from Nyíregyháza
Hungarian footballers
Hungary youth international footballers
Hungary under-21 international footballers
Association football midfielders
Szombathelyi Haladás footballers
Gyirmót FC Győr players
Békéscsaba 1912 Előre footballers
Nyíregyháza Spartacus FC players
Tiszakécske FC footballers
Nemzeti Bajnokság I players
Nemzeti Bajnokság II players
Nemzeti Bajnokság III players
Sportspeople from Szabolcs-Szatmár-Bereg County
21st-century Hungarian people